Joseph Eugene Bramlett (born April 7, 1988) is an American professional golfer on the PGA Tour. He was one of two PGA Tour golfers of African-American descent on the 2011 PGA Tour, alongside Tiger Woods.

Early life and career 
Bramlett, a biracial African American, is a graduate of St. Francis High School in Mountain View, California. He then attended Stanford University for four years, and he earned his PGA Tour card at the 2010 Qualifying School. He was the first black golfer to graduate from the tour's qualifying school since Adrian Stills in 1985.

Bramlett made twelve of 25 cuts and finished 196th on the 2011 money list, lost his Tour card, and later joined the Web.com Tour. He finished 28th in 2012, three spots and $4,000 shy of rejoining the PGA Tour. He qualified again in 2019.

Bramlett won the Korn Ferry Tour Championship in 2021, qualifying him once again for the PGA Tour. He finished in 37th place at the 2022 U.S. Open.

Bramlett has four top-10 finishes on the PGA Tour.

Amateur wins
Note: This list may be incomplete
2010 Northeast Amateur

Professional wins (1)

Korn Ferry Tour wins (1)

Results in major championships
Results not in chronological order in 2020.

CUT = missed the half-way cut
"T" = tied
NT = No tournament due to the COVID-19 pandemic

Results in The Players Championship

CUT = missed the halfway cut

See also
2010 PGA Tour Qualifying School graduates
2019 Korn Ferry Tour Finals graduates
2021 Korn Ferry Tour Finals graduates
2022 Korn Ferry Tour Finals graduates

References

External links

College Profile: Stanford

American male golfers
African-American golfers
Stanford Cardinal men's golfers
PGA Tour golfers
Korn Ferry Tour graduates
Golfers from California
People from Stanford, California
People from Saratoga, California
Sportspeople from the San Francisco Bay Area
1988 births
Living people
21st-century African-American sportspeople
20th-century African-American people